Jasbina Ahluwalia is a matchmaker/dating coach and a radio host. She is also the founder and President of Intersections Match, a relationship coaching and online dating business for Indians.

A former practising attorney in Chicago, IL, and San Francisco, CA, She earned her JD from the University of Michigan Law School. She also holds both a BA and MA in Philosophy from Vanderbilt University.

Career

Podcasts 
Ahluwalia hosts two podcasts on Blogtalk Radio.; Intersections Match Talk Radio, a lifestyle show, and NetIP Spotlight – Live Your Potential, a monthly radio show featuring experts on trending topics, ranging from health to political affairs and leadership.

She has also published relationship Q and A videos on her website.

Panels 
Jasbina Ahluwalia has participated in and moderated panels on entrepreneurship & work-life balance at:Harvard Business School, Northwestern University, Wharton, and Columbia University.

Ahluwalia has also anchored relationship Q&A sessions for numerous organizations, including: the Cornell India Association, NetIP (Network of Indian Professionals) Indus Women Leaders AAPI India Community Center in Silicon Valley and The Indo-American Arts Council.

Relationship Columns 
Jasbina Ahluwalia has written columns on relationships and dating for online forums and print publications, including YourTango, Digital Romance, Lavalife.com, India Currents (CA), India West (CA), Bibi Magazine (NYC), Oye! Times (Canada), Desi Express (Atlanta), Desi Club (U.S.), and Lights Camera Action (TX).

Industry Conferences 
Ahluwalia has spoken at several matchmaking industry conferences regarding cultural nuances in the South Asian singles relationship coaching business, including the Matchmaking Institute, Matchmakers Alliance, iDate and the Great Love Debate National Tour in Austin, Chicago, Dallas, San Diego, San Jose, Toronto (Canada), Washington D.C.

References

External links 

 

1971 births
Living people
Matchmakers
Vanderbilt University alumni
University of Michigan Law School alumni
Ahluwalia
Indian radio presenters
American radio hosts
Indian lawyers
American lawyers
Marriage in India